Sudhir Ranjan Majumdar (18 May 1939 – 4 January 2009) was the Chief Minister of Tripura in India from 5 February 1988 to 19 February 1992. He was a school teacher before entering politics. He was also a member of the Upper House of Indian parliament the Rajya Sabha as a member of the Indian National Congress representing Tripura.

References

Chief Ministers of Tripura
1939 births
2009 deaths
Rajya Sabha members from Tripura
Chief ministers from Indian National Congress
Tripura MLAs 1988–1993
Indian National Congress politicians
Trinamool Congress politicians
Tripura politicians